Oliver Saludares Bias (born 15 June 2001) is a professional footballer who plays as a winger for Philippines Football League  club Azkals Development Team and the Philippines national team. He is also the captain of the Philippines U23 team. He previously played for the youth national teams of Germany, the country of his birth.

Club career

RB Leipzig
Bias made his professional debut for RB Leipzig on 2 August 2018, coming on as a substitute in the 64th minute for Ibrahima Konaté in the UEFA Europa League qualifying match against Swedish club Häcken of the Allsvenskan. The match concluded in a 1–1 away draw.

FC Nitra
Bias joined Slovak Fortuna Liga club FC Nitra in late January 2021.

International career
Bias was born to a German father and a Filipina mother which made him eligible to represent either Germany or Philippines at international level.

Germany youth
Bias has played for the youth national teams of Germany.

Philippines
Bias accepted a call-up to the Philippines national team in May 2021 for the 2022 FIFA World Cup qualifiers. He made his debut on  7 June against China PR, where he picked up a yellow card in their 2–0 loss.

Philippines U23
He captained the Philippines U23 team at the 2022 AFC U-23 Asian Cup qualifiers; they finished last in their group with a winless campaign. 

Bias was included in the 20-man squad for 31st Southeast Asian Games, which was held in Vietnam.

References

External links
 Profile at DFB.de
 Profile at kicker.de

2001 births
Living people
People from Erzgebirgskreis
Citizens of the Philippines through descent
Filipino footballers
Philippines international footballers
German footballers
Germany youth international footballers
German sportspeople of Filipino descent
German expatriate footballers
Association football wingers
RB Leipzig players
FSV Optik Rathenow players
FC Nitra players
Regionalliga players
Slovak Super Liga players
Expatriate footballers in Slovakia
Filipino expatriate sportspeople in Slovakia
German expatriate sportspeople in Slovakia
Azkals Development Team players
Competitors at the 2021 Southeast Asian Games
Footballers from Saxony
Southeast Asian Games competitors for the Philippines